Pariser is a surname. Notable people with the surname include:

Eli Pariser, American activist and writer
Rudolph Pariser, physical and polymer chemist

See also
Parisian (disambiguation)